Čejkovice is a municipality and village in Kutná Hora District in the Central Bohemian Region of the Czech Republic. It has about 30 inhabitants.

History
The first written mention of Čejkovice is from 1360.

Gallery

References

Villages in Kutná Hora District